The molecular formula C7H6O2 (molar mass: 122.12 g/mol, exact mass: 122.036779 u) may refer to:

 Benzoic acid
 1,3-Benzodioxole
 Hydroxybenzaldehyde
 Salicylaldehyde (2-hydroxybenzaldehyde)
 3-Hydroxybenzaldehyde
 4-Hydroxybenzaldehyde
 Tropolone